This is a list of schools in the Northern Rivers and Mid North Coast regions of New South Wales, Australia. The New South Wales education system traditionally consists of primary schools, which accommodate students from Kindergarten to Year 6 (ages 5–12), and high schools, which accommodate students from Years 7 to 12 (ages 12–18).

Public schools

Primary schools (K-6)

High schools

In New South Wales, a high school generally covers Years 7 to 12 in the education system, and a central or community school, intended to provide comprehensive education in a rural district, covers Kindergarten to Year 12. An additional class of high schools has emerged in recent years as a result of amalgamations which have produced multi-campus colleges consisting of Junior and Senior campuses.

While most schools are comprehensive and take in all students of high school age living within its defined school boundaries, some schools are either specialist in a given Key Learning Area, or selective in that they set examinations or other performance criteria for entrance. Grafton High School is the only selective school in the Northern Rivers region.

Special schools

Special schools are public schools designed for children or youth with chronic disabilities or who for other reasons cannot be accommodated in the comprehensive school system.

Defunct primary schools

Private schools

Catholic primary schools
In New South Wales, Catholic primary schools are usually (but not always) linked to a parish. Prior to the 1970s, most schools were founded by  religious institutes, but with the decrease in membership of these institutes, together with major reforms inside the church, lay teachers and administrators began to take over the schools, a process which completed by approximately 1995. The Lismore Diocese covers most schools in the two regions, with the Maitland-Newcastle-Diocese handling schools in the Greater Taree and Great Lakes LGAs. The Catholic Education Office (CEO) in each diocese is responsible for coordinating administration, curriculum and policy across the Catholic school system. Preference for enrolment is given to Catholic students from the parish or local area, although non-Catholic students are admitted if room is available.

Catholic high schools

Other private schools

Defunct private schools

See also
List of schools in Australia
List of schools in New South Wales
List of schools in Gold Coast, Queensland

References

External links
School Finder (Department of Education)

Northern Rivers
Northern Rivers
Mid North Coast